Ericentrus rubrus, the orange clinid, is a species of clinid endemic to the waters around New Zealand where it can be found in tide pools and in the subtidal zone from low water to depths of about .  It prefers to inhabit beds of brown algae where it preys on the small crustaceans that also inhabit these areas.  It is currently the only known member of the genus Ericentrus.

References

Clinidae
Endemic marine fish of New Zealand
Taxa named by Frederick Hutton (scientist)
Fish described in 1872
Monotypic ray-finned fish genera